The 1978 Uganda National League was the 11th season of the Ugandan football championship, the top-level football league of Uganda.

Overview
The 1978 Uganda National League was contested by 15 teams and was won by Simba FC, while Uganda Police FC and Black Rhino were relegated.

League standings

Leading goalscorer
The top goalscorer in the 1978 season was Jimmy Kirunda of Kampala City Council FC with 32 goals.

References

External links
 Uganda - List of Champions - RSSSF (Hans Schöggl)
 Ugandan Football League Tables - League321.com

Ugandan Super League seasons
Uganda
Uganda
1